Mai Jindo  (born 1942) was a laborer woman from Tando Bahawal whose two sons and son-in-law were killed by a Pakistan Army detachment along with seven other villagers in 1992 of farmers involved in a land dispute,. This incident also known as Tando Bahawal incident. Mai Jindo fought hard for justice. Two of her daughters, Hakimzadi and Zaibunissa, set themselves on fire in order to get the authorities to take up their brothers' cases.

Tando Bahawal incident
On 5 June 1992, a contingent of Pakistan Army, led by Major Arshad Jameel, raided the village of Tando Bahawal, on the outskirts of Hyderabad, Sindh, kidnapped nine villagers and later shot them dead on the bank of the Indus River near Jamshoro. The dead included Mai Jindo's two sons, Bahadur and Manthar, and a son-in-law, Haji Akram. Later Army alleged that the villagers were terrorists and were agents of India's intelligence agency Research and Analysis Wing (RAW). The media, however, exposed the claims as phony and produced evidence that the victims were farmers involved in a land dispute.

Hakimzadi and Zaibunissa

On 11 September 1996, two daughters of Mai Jindo, Hakimzadi, and Zaibunissa set themselves afire to protest delays in the execution of Major Arshad Jamil, convicted of murdering their brothers and seven other villagers. They were hospitalized in critical condition and both later died.

Court-martial
After a long and painful struggle by Mai Jindo and her two self-immolated daughters, the Army dismissed Arshad Jamil and tried him by court-martial. He was sentenced to death in October 1996. The Chief of Army Staff Jehangir Karamat confirmed the conviction and sentence and the President of Pakistan Farooq Ahmad Khan Leghari rejected a mercy petition.
Previously in October 1995, Arshad Jameel filled an appeal petition with the Supreme Court of Pakistan, but his petition was dismissed.
Major Arshad Jamil was hanged in Hyderabad Central Jail on 28 October 1996.

Compensation for families of victims

In 2004, 12 years after the Tando Bahawal incident and 8 years after Major Arshad Jamil's execution, the Government of Sindh allotted 24 acres of land to each bereaved family in Thatta district. Later Mai Jindo stated that the land was barren. In 2006, District Nazim Kunwar Naveed Jamil distributed compensation cheques for Rs4.55 million among relatives of the victims of the Tando Bahawal carnage.

See also
Murder of Nazim Jokhio

References

1942 births
Living people
Sindhi people
Pakistan military scandals
1996 in Pakistan
1990s murders in Pakistan
1990s crimes in Pakistan
1990s crimes in Asia
Murder in Sindh
Torture in Pakistan